The Kleine Spree  is a river of Saxony, Germany. It is a left branch of the Spree, from which it splits near Großdubrau and which it joins near Spreewitz.

See also
List of rivers of Saxony

Rivers of Saxony
0Kleine Spree
Rivers of Germany